Frug is a Jewish surname. Notable people with the surname include:

 Gerald Frug (born 1939), American law professor, husband of Mary Joe Frug
 Mary Joe Frug (1941–1991), American law professor, feminist and murder victim
 Simon Frug (1860–1916), Russian Jewish poet, lyricist and author

Jewish surnames